Admiral Yastur-ul-Haq Malik  (b. 24 December 1931), is a retired four-star rank admiral who served as the Chief of Naval Staff (CNS) of Pakistan Navy from 10 November 1988 until retiring from his military service on 8 November 1991.

Admiral belonged to a Military family. Notable members of the family include his brothers Commodore Ikram ul Haq Malik (R), Brigadier Mansoor Ul Haq Malik (R), Brigadier Manzoor Ul Haq Malik (R) and General Zahoor Ul Haq Malik (late).

Biography

Naval career and education
Yastur-ul-Haq Malik was born on 24 December 1931 in Peshawar, KPK, in Pakistan.

He attended and graduated from the Saint Patrick's College in Karachi and gained commissioned as Midshipman  in 1951 and inducted in the Surface Branch of the Pakistan Navy in 1954. After his initial training at the Pakistan Military Academy, he was sent to United Kingdom to attend the Britannia Royal Naval College at Darmouth where he graduated and further trained with the Royal Navy in 1958.

Upon returning to Pakistan in 1958, he was promoted as Lieutenant and provided his services as gunnery in the PNS Badr and participated in second war with India in 1965. He briefly served as a staff member of the military secretary's team in the Ayub administration and was an ADC to President Ayub Khan in 1960s.

He then participated in third war with India in 1971 as Lieutenant-Commander while stationing in Karachi.

After the war in 1971, Lt.Cdr. Malik went to attend the Air War College of Pakistan Air Force where he graduated with a staff course degree. He also attended the National Defence University and graduated with master's degree in Defence studies.

Staff appointments and Chief of naval staff

Throughout his career, Malik served in the administrative branches of the Pakistan Navy and once posted as the Naval attaché at Pakistan Embassy, Paris in France.

In 1980s, he was assumed the command of Pakistan Fleet as its commander (COMPAK) from 1977 until 1982 but was later posted in Navy NHQ as DCNS (Personnel) from 1982 to 1984. His command assignments also included his role as Vice Chief of Naval Staff (VCNS) from 1984 until 1986 before being appointed as Chairman of the Pakistan National Shipping Corporation (PNSC) in 1986.

In 1988, Prime Minister Benazir Bhutto announced his appointment as Chief of Naval Staff and Vice-Admiral Malik took over the command of Navy from Admiral Iftikhar Ahmed Sirohey who was elevated as Chairman of the Joint Chiefs of Staff Committee on 10 November 1988.

His tenure only ran for two years and left the command of the Navy to his VCNS Vice-Admiral S.M. Khan who was promoted as Admiral on 11 August 1991. As Chief of Naval Staff, Admiral Malik is credited for commissioning the "PNS Ahsan"— the naval base which is situated in Ormara, Balochistan in Pakistan.

Awards and decorations

References

External links
Official website of Pakistan Navy

 

Living people
1933 births
Military personnel from Lucknow
People from Karachi
Pakistan Military Academy alumni
Graduates of Britannia Royal Naval College
Pakistani diplomats
Pakistani military personnel of the Indo-Pakistani War of 1971
National Defence University, Pakistan alumni
Pakistan Navy admirals
Chiefs of Naval Staff (Pakistan)
Pakistani naval attachés
St. Patrick's College (Karachi) alumni